Groote Schuur High School is a public english co-ed medium high school in the Western Cape.

External links
 

Schools in Cape Town
Newlands, Cape Town
Year of establishment missing